The 2013 FIVB Volleyball Men's Club World Championship was the 9th edition of the event. It was held in Betim, Brazil from 15 to 20 October 2013. Sada Cruzeiro won the title for the first time in front their home crowd. Wallace de Souza was named Most Valuable Player.

Qualification

Pools composition

Squads

Venue

Pool standing procedure
 Match points
 Number of matches won
 Sets ratio
 Points ratio
 Result of the last match between the tied teams

Match won 3–0 or 3–1: 3 match points for the winner, 0 match points for the loser
Match won 3–2: 2 match points for the winner, 1 match point for the loser

Preliminary round
All times are Brasília Time (UTC−03:00).

Pool A

|}

|}

Pool B

|}

|}

Final round

Times of 19 October are Brasília Time (UTC−03:00) and times of 20 October are Brasília Summer Time (UTC−02:00).

Semifinals

|}

3rd place match

|}

Final

|}

Final standing

Awards

Most Valuable Player
 Wallace de Souza (Sada Cruzeiro)
Best Setter
 William Arjona (Sada Cruzeiro)
Best Outside Spikers
 Yoandy Leal (Sada Cruzeiro)
 Lukáš Diviš (Lokomotiv Novosibirsk)

Best Middle Blockers
 Emanuele Birarelli (Trentino Diatec)
 Matteo Burgsthaler (Trentino Diatec)
Best Opposite Spiker
 Tsvetan Sokolov (Trentino Diatec)
Best Libero
 Sérgio Nogueira (Sada Cruzeiro)

External links
Official website
Final Standing
Awards
Statistics

2013 FIVB Men's Club World Championship
FIVB Men's Club World Championship
FIVB Men's Club World Championship
FIVB Volleyball Men's Club World Championship
FIVB Volleyball Men's Club World Championship
Sport in Minas Gerais